Burruyacú Department is a department located in the northwest of the Tucumán Province, Argentina. According to the 2001 census, its population was 32,936 The department seat is the town of Burruyacú.

Geography
The department has a total area of 3,605 km2, making it the largest department in the province. It has a mountainous west formed by the Sierra de Medinas. East of these mountains is a fertile and sparsely populated plain where ranching and agriculture dominate the land use.

Adjacent districts
Salta Province – north
Santiago del Estero Province – east
Cruz Alta Department – south
Trancas Department and Tafí Viejo Department – west

Towns and comunas rurales
Benjamín Aráoz y El Tajamar
Burruyacú
El Chañar
El Naranjo y El Sunchal
El Puestito
El Timbó
Gobernador Garmendia
La Ramada y La Cruz
Piedrabuena
7 de abril
Tala Pozo
Villa Padre Monti

Transportation infrastructure

Major highways
National Route 34 
Tucumán Province Route 304
Tucumán Province Route 305 
Tucuman Province Route 310 
Tucuman Province Route 317
Tucuman Province Route 321
Tucuman Province Route 336

External links
Tucuman Province Government website

Departments of Tucumán Province